Brian G. McHale is a US academic and literary theorist who writes on a range of fiction and poetics, mainly relating to postmodernism and narrative theory. He is currently Distinguished Humanities Professor of English at Ohio State University. His area of expertise is Twentieth-Century British and American Literature.

Education
McHale was born in 1952 and raised in Pittsburgh, Pennsylvania. He received his B.A. from Brown University in 1974 and his D.Phil. from Merton College, Oxford in 1979.  He is a Rhodes Scholar.

Career
Brian G. McHale is the editor of the journal Poetics Today: International Journal for Theory and Analysis of Literature and Communication. He has taught at Tel Aviv University and West Virginia University; he was visiting professor at the University of Pittsburgh, the University of Freiburg (Germany), and the University of Canterbury (New Zealand). McHale was an honorary professor, from 2009 to 2011, at Shanghai Jiao Tong University, China. He was previously the associate editor and co-editor (until 2004) and is since 2015 the current editor of the journal Poetics Today. He is co-founder, with James Phelan and David Herman, of Project Narrative, an initiative based at Ohio State University. He is the past President (2011) of The Association for the Study of the Arts of the Present, and President of The International Society for the Study of Narrative (ISSN).

He is the author of Postmodernist Fiction (1987), Constructing Postmodernism (1992), and The Obligation toward the Difficult Whole (2004), and Introduction to Postmodernism (2015) from Cambridge Press. He is co-editor with Randall Stevenson of The Edinburgh Companion to Twentieth-Century Literatures in English (2006), and co-edited The Routledge Companion to Experimental Literature with Joe Bray and Alison Gibbons (2012) and The Cambridge Companion to Thomas Pynchon with Inger H. Dalsgaard and Luc Herman (2012). 
He has written "What Was Postmodernism?". He has also written about the cultural resonance of Alice in Wonderland, which he regards as a symbol of postmodernism.

See also
 Descriptive poetics

References

Living people
Alumni of Merton College, Oxford
American literary theorists
Brown University alumni
Ohio State University faculty
Writers from Pittsburgh
Academic journal editors
Year of birth missing (living people)